Twisleton is a surname, and may refer to:

 Charlotte Twisleton née Wattell (1770-1812), English actress
 Edward Turner Boyd Twisleton (born 1809), British Poor Law Commissioner, son of Thomas Twisleton
 Francis Morphet Twisleton (1873–1917), New Zealand soldier 
 Frederick Benjamin Twisleton (1799–1887), also Frederick Fiennes, 16th Baron Saye and Sele, son of Thomas Twisleton 
 Sir George Twisleton, 1st Baronet (c.1605–1635)
 George Twisleton (1618–1667), English politician 
 John Twisleton (c.1614–1682), English Cromwellian baronet 
 Philip Twisleton (died 1678), English New Model Army officer
 Thomas Twisleton (1770/1–1824), English Archdeacon of Colombo, son of Thomas Twisleton, 13th Baron Saye and Sele
 Thomas Twisleton, 13th Baron Saye and Sele (c.1735–1788), British Army officer

See also
 Twisleton-Wykeham-Fiennes family